St. Joseph's Central School & Junior College is a mixed school governed by the Malankara Catholic Diocese of Thiruvalla in Mundakayam, India. The school offers plus2 Science and Commerce courses. St. Joseph's Central School was established in  1981 and was upgraded to senior secondary level in 1997, and takes its students from Mundakayam and the surrounding area. Each year about 100 students join the school.The school offers best education to the students from Mundakayam and its surrounding . There is well transportation facilities and with best lab facilities available .

Staff
 Patron: Thomas Mar Koorilose (Archbishop Thiruvalla), 
 Manager: Rev.Fr. Mattai Mannurvattakkettil
 Principal: Shree . John TJ

References

Catholic secondary schools in India
Christian schools in Kerala
High schools and secondary schools in Kerala
Schools in Kottayam district
Educational institutions established in 1981
1981 establishments in Kerala